The JLT Motors Ecoyota is a series of French aircraft engines, designed and produced by JLT Motors of Boos, Seine-Maritime for use in ultralight aircraft.

The company seems to have been founded about 2008 and gone out of business in 2010.

Design and development
The engine is a three-cylinder, in-line, four-stroke,   displacement, liquid-cooled, automotive-conversion gasoline engine design, with a poly V belt reduction drive with a reduction ratio of 2.41:1. It employs electronic ignition and has a compression ratio of 10.5:1.

Variants
Ecoyota 82
Model that produces 
Ecoyota 100
Model that produces

Applications
Best Off Sky Ranger
G1 Aviation G1
ICP Savannah
Zenith STOL CH 701

Specifications (Ecoyota 100)

See also

References

External links
Official website archives on Archive.org 

JLT Motors aircraft engines
Liquid-cooled aircraft piston engines
2000s aircraft piston engines